The Supercoppa di Serie C, formerly named Supercoppa di Lega Pro, is an Italian football competition played by the three group winners of Serie C, inaugurated in 2000.

Forerunners
The FIGC introduced a third-level national football championship for the first time following the reform of 1926. The Northern Lower Directory, the fascist Authority ruling the league, introduced a national cup for the group winners.
1926–27: AC Monza
1927–28: Edera Trieste

In 1928 the fascists decided to allow the fully national Higher Directory to organize the third-level championship instead. A cup for the group winners, and promoted to newly-born Serie B, was maintained.
1928–29: Spezia Calcio
1929–30: Udinese

However, Italian tifosi showed a very little interest for this honorific cups, so they were discontinued for seventy years.

Winners

See also
 Lega Pro Prima Divisione
 Supercoppa di Lega di Seconda Divisione
 Football in Italy

References

External links
 Roll of Honours at Lega-calcio-serie-c.it
 Serie C1 Super Cup at Rsssf.com

4
Serie C
Supercup C1
Recurring sporting events established in 2000
2000 establishments in Italy